On February 20, 1964, the second parliamentary election for the Tibetan Parliament in Exile was held. It was the second time Tibetans in exile were able to choose their representatives. Three seats were separated specifically for women as an especial request from the Dalai Lama and the number of representatives was increased from 14 to 17. The four classic schools of Tibetan Buddhism were represented as the three historical regions of Tibet; U-Tsang, Kham and Ando.

Composition

References

1964
1964 elections in Asia